The Lower West Province was a two-member electoral province of the Western Australian Legislative Council, located in the Peel and South West region of the state. It was one of several rural seats created following the enactment of the Constitution Acts Amendment Act (No.2) 1963, and became effective on 22 May 1965. It was consistently a safe seat for the Liberal Party who were able to maintain both seats comfortably.

In 1989, the province was abolished by the Acts Amendment (Electoral Reform) Act 1987, and was integrated into the South West and East Metropolitan regions under the new proportional voting system.

Geography
The province was made up of several complete Legislative Assembly districts, which changed at each distribution.

Representation

Members

References
 

Former electoral provinces of Western Australia